da Vinci Arts Middle School, also known as da Vinci Middle School, is a public middle school in the Kerns neighborhood of Portland, Oregon, in the United States.  It is an arts focus school in the Portland Public School District. The building was originally used as a high school, Girls Polytechnic High School, which was renamed James Monroe High School in 1967 and closed in fall 1978, when its student body was merged with, and moved to, Washington High School.

History 
The building that now houses da Vinci Arts Middle School was designed in the classical revival style of architecture by the architect George Howell Jones, who designed almost all of the schools in the Portland public school district between 1908 and 1932, along with Floyd Naramore. This school opened in 1928 as Girls Polytechnic High School. Before the construction of this building, the Girls Polytechnic program had been held at the Portland High School, which was deemed unfit in 1928. It remained the Girls Polytechnic until 1967, when it was renamed James Monroe High School, for president James Monroe, and was opened to boys.

In 1993, parents of students at Buckman Arts Magnet Elementary School formed a proposal for an arts focused middle school. The district finally accepted the proposal, and the school opened in 1996 with 140 students and a very small staff. It was not until 1998 that the school had a full-time principal, and there was no counselor until 2000. So far, da Vinci had been a program and had shared the building with other programs, but in July 2003 the school board changed da Vinci's status into a school, and it has remained a school since then.

Due to concerns about mathematics and science test scores being too low, da Vinci's schedule was changed in fall 2016 to allow for increased class time in the those classes. Students protested against these changes, because it would mean students would no longer have the same teacher for language arts and social studies for all three years at middle school. Also, sixth graders would be in separate classes from the rest of the school in all subjects except art. By doing that, the new schedule might disrupt the sense of community that the core classes had. The schedule change went into effect in September 2015.

Curriculum 

Da Vinci Arts Middle School is an arts magnet school. It offers students two electives of 2D art, 3D art, creative writing, dance, music or drama.

Extracurricular activities 
The school has many after school programs, such the Destino dance team, a rock band known as Trogdor, a Black Student Union, a Queer-Straight Alliance, a ukulele choir, a jazz ensemble and a chess club. The school has put on numerous plays, as well as three student-written rock operas. There is also a coding club.

References

1928 establishments in Oregon
1996 establishments in Oregon
Kerns, Portland, Oregon
Northeast Portland, Oregon
Public middle schools in Oregon
Schools in Portland, Oregon